The 1977–78 snooker season was a series of snooker tournaments played between September 1977 and June 1978. The following table outlines the results for the ranking and the invitational events.


Calendar

Official rankings 

The top 16 of the world rankings.

Notes

References

External links 
 

1977
Season 1978
Season 1977